Joan Sydney King (5 September 1936 – 28 December 2022) was an English-born Australian actress, primarily known for her television roles in soap operas and serials but who also appeared in theatre.

Sydney started her career in local theatre before appearing on television where her best-known roles were in the soap operas A Country Practice as Maggie Sloane, E Street as publican Mary Patchett and Neighbours as Valda Sheergold.

Biography

Early life
Joan Sydney King was born in Kensington, Central London, England, on 5 September 1936, to Sam and Rose who met whilst working at hotels. The family relocated to Wales during the Second World War, first to Rhyl and then to Rhuddlan. She was educated at Abergele Grammar School and trained at the Oldham Repertory Theatre. She emigrated to Australia with her family as "Ten Pound Poms" in 1965, first living in Perth, Western Australia, then moving to Sydney, New South Wales, in 1974.

Career
After appearing on stage and film in her native England, Sydney featured in radio at the BBC and made her screen debut aged 21 in the 1957 film version of English play When We Are Married.

A Country Practice
Sydney was known for playing Margaret "Maggie" Sloan, the no-nonsense but compassionate matron of the fictional Wandin Valley Bush Nursing Hospital in the Seven Network rural series A Country Practice from 1983 to 1990 and over 400 episodes. She won the Silver Logie Award for Most Outstanding Actress for her performance in 1989. She also starred alongside her sister Maggie King in a movie-length pilot for a subsequently unmade series in 1987 called Sisterly Love.

Sydney was the second actress to play the matron of the fictional Wandin Valley Hospital after original actress Helen Scott. Her successor, Anne Brennen (played by Mary Regan), used the more modern title "Director of Nursing". After Brennen left, the title was changed back to Matron during the tenure of Rosemary Prior (Maureen Edwards). 

In 1993, after 12 seasons on air, A Country Practice was abruptly cancelled, but rival network Ten picked it up soon afterwards. Production was relocated from Pitt Town, New South Wales, to Emerald, Victoria, and, after having spent time in England, Sydney reprised her role as matron, one of five actors including Joyce Jacobs and Andrew Blackman to return to the new ACP series.

Neighbours
In 2002, she joined the long-running serial Neighbours as Valda Sheergold, initially on a semi-regular recurring basis before becoming a permanent member of the cast for the 2007–2008 season.

Other roles
In 1990, Sydney briefly joined the new soap opera E Street in the role of publican Mary Patchett. She also had guest roles in many other programs including the sitcom Mother and Son and the dramas All Saints, Something in the Air and Miss Fisher's Murder Mysteries.

In 2013, she featured in the telemovie Cliffy, based on the life of Australian athlete Cliff Young.

Personal life
Sydney married her husband, Gerald, in 1960. They had two children, a daughter named Ananda and a son named Matthew. The couple later separated. Another son from an earlier relationship, Tony Braxton-Smith, is the former CEO of Journey Beyond (known then as Great Southern Rail). She was the elder sister of actress Maggie King.

Death
Sydney died, aged 86, at her home in Sydney, New South Wales, on 28 December 2022 after a long illness with Alzheimer's disease which had been diagnosed with breast cancer in 2015.

Filmography

Theatre stage roles

Awards and nominations

References

External links
 

1936 births
2022 deaths
20th-century Australian actresses
21st-century Australian people
21st-century Australian women
Australian stage actresses
Australian television actresses
Deaths from Alzheimer's disease
Deaths from dementia in Australia
English emigrants to Australia
Logie Award winners
People from Kensington